LearnShare LLC is a software company located inside Arrowhead Business Park in Maumee, OH. The company provides human resources software to businesses. LearnShare was formed from a consortium in 1996.

History 
LearnShare LLC was founded in September 1996 as a consortium of Fortune 500 companies. The founding companies were 3M, John Deere, General Motors, as well as others.

1995-2000: Consortium Creation 
In October 1995 Rick Corry of Owens Corning invited 18 non-competing companies to discuss the formation of a collaborative training consortium. A nucleus of these companies (those listed above) established a limited liability corporation.

In September 1996, four more companies joined the consortium, including Chevron and Northwest Airlines.

Each company contributed $100,000 a year for 2 years and received a seat on the board of directors. The Board also had three non-voting members from various universities.

LearnShare, LLC started as a service organization that developed multi-media and distance learning technologies. The purpose was for member companies to share existing materials and expertise.  The consortium would then develop technology-based training at the lowest possible cost for member companies.

Through 2000, LearnShare was funded by its founding members. Starting in 2001, the consortium hired Lois Webster from Motorola as the CEO/General Manager of LearnShare to move the company to a for-profit company.

2000-2007: Sustaining Members
In 2001 LearnShare accepted "sustaining members" in 2-year agreements. Since that time, 40 additional corporations joined the consortium which now represents more than 2.5 million employees.

In 2002, UnitedHealth Group purchased ownership in LearnShare and joined the Board of Management.  Also in this year, LearnShare's LMS was fully functional as an enterprise-wide solution.

LearnShare created agreements with third-party suppliers of courseware for pay-as-you access through the learning management system. LearnShare offers third party courses at the price of one course at a time.

2007–2016: A Technology Company
In 2007 LearnShare expanded its software system with modules in areas such as Performance Management and Employee Profiles. It also added the capability to the Learning Management System to integrate virtual classroom training.

In 2008, LearnShare became a management-owned company.

In 2009, it added an online conversion tool to change PowerPoint presentations to e-learning courses.

The LearnShare system now includes modules for Performance Management, Succession, and Social Collaboration and Learning.

2016: Acquired by UL PURE Learning 
In 2016, LearnShare was acquired by UL Pure Learning

See also
 e-learning
 Learning Management System
 Performance Management
 Talent management
 Consortium

Notes

Learning management systems